Tata Ace is a model of mini trucks manufactured by Tata Motors. It was launched in 2005.

History
In December 2000, Girish Wagh was given a brief by Ravi Kant to create a novel lightweight truck line that would add to Tata's current truck range. It was to be economical and to take on the three-wheeled cargo auto rickshaws in the Indian market. Based on this brief, Wagh approached users of three-wheel cargo rickshaws and got their feedback on Tata's future four-wheel cargo vehicle. The feedback indicated the need for an economical vehicle that could carry light loads over short distances. Additionally, the feedback also revealed that future owners would prefer owning a four-wheeler cargo vehicle for the perceived prestige it would offer over a three-wheeled vehicle.

Tata Ace has created a new mini segment in India. Priced between INR 2.25 and 3.35 lakh, the company aims to convert three-wheeler users to four-wheelers.

Models
Tata produces three main models of the Ace family - the Ace, the Super Ace, Ace Zip and the Ace EV. Both the Ace and Ace Zip have a passenger variant called the Magic and Magic IRIS.

Ace 

The standard Ace HT is powered by a two-cylinder 702 cc engine, delivering  at 3200 rpm and a torque of 3.8 kgf⋅m (37 N⋅m) at 2000 rpm. It has a permissible loading capacity of 750 kg (1650 lb).

The Ace EX adds a five-speed gearbox, stop-start and larger wheels (13" over 12") and wider tires (155 rather than 145), and a top speed of 70 km/h.

Tata Super Ace

The Tata Super Ace is a 1 Ton diesel mini truck aimed for Intra City Applications and Last Mile Distribution. The Super Ace has a turning radius of 5.1 m and a mileage of 14 km/L (8.75 mpl), which gives it maximum range of 440 km per its 38 L fuel tank. It has a three-way drop load body which provides a 60 cm height for loading and unloading.

Specifications 
Engine	Tata 475 TCIC (BSIII)
Engine capacity	1405 cc
Max engine output	70 hp @ 4500 rpm
Max engine torque	13.8 kg⋅m @ 2500 rpm
Fuel tank capacity	38 L
Clutch and transmission	Clutch	Single plate dry friction diaphragm type
Gearbox	Synchromesh 5+1
Steering	Power assisted hydraulic Rack & pinion
Suspension	
Front: MacPherson strut with anti roll bar
Rear: Leaf Spring with Telescopic Shock absorber
Brakes	
Front	"Hydraulic dual circuit, vacuum assisted, automatic wear adjuster Disc brake"
Rear	Drum Brakes
Wheels & Tyres	Tyres	165 R14  & 175 LT 8PR
Dimensions	
Wheelbase	2380 mm
Width	1565 mm
Length	4340 mm
height	1858 mm
Front track	1340 mm
Rear track	1320 mm
Ground clearance	160 mm
Load body dimensions	2630 mm × 1460 mm × 300 mm
Turning Circle Radius	5.10 m
Weights	GVW	2180 kg
Kerb weight	1180 kg
Performance	
Gradability	39%
Top speed	125 km/h

The Super Ace Bigboy

The Super Ace Bigboy is the prototype passenger version of the Super Ace. It was designed as part of the Public Utility Vehicle Modernisation Program in the Philippines.

Tata Ace Zip

The Tata Ace Zip is marketed as a micro truck in India. Priced from Rs.1.9 lakhs INR onwards, the company aims to convert three-wheeler users to four-wheelers. One of the ideas that prompted the launch of this vehicle was to develop more opportunities of self-employment in the country. Moreover, there was a need for an efficient last mile vehicle, Tata sought to find the gap in the market and released the Ace Zip. The 611 cc engine delivers a power of 11.3 hp at 3000 rpm and a torque of 3.16 kgf⋅m at 1600–1800 rpm. It has a permissible loading capacity of 600 kg.

Ace Magic+

In June 2007 Tata Motors launched the passenger variant of the Ace, named Magic, featuring an all-steel cabin. It offers a seating capacity of 4-7 passengers with adequate legroom.

The Magic meets BS-III emission norms and has been developed for use in urban, semi-urban or rural markets. It is backed by a 36,000 km/12-month warranty. The Magic range starts at Rs 2.60 lakh (ex-showroom, Pune).

Tata Magic Iris

A passenger carrier based on the Tata Ace Zip platform, the Tata Magic Iris, has also been launched.

Ace EV

The Ace EV is the first product featuring Tata Motors’ EVOGEN powertrain. It is powered by a 27 kW (36 hp) motor with 130Nm of peak torque, cargo volume of 208 ft3 and grade-ability of 22%.

Manufacturing locations
The mini truck is now produced at a facility in Pantnagar, Uttarakhand, although it was initially manufactured at Pune.

See also
Tata Ace Zip
Tata Magic
Mahindra Maxximo

References
 

Ace